High School Hero is a 1946 American film directed by Arthur Dreifuss and starring Freddie Stewart.

It is the third of The Teen Agers series and was also known as High School Scandal.

References

External links

Review of film at Variety

1946 films
1946 musical comedy films
1940s teen films
American black-and-white films
American musical comedy films
Films directed by Arthur Dreifuss
Monogram Pictures films
1940s high school films
1940s English-language films
1940s American films